Alexandre Barthe (born 5 March 1986) is a French former footballer who played as a defender. He has won the Bulgarian league championship on six occasions in a row (2010–11, 2011–12, 2012–13, 2013–14, 2014–15, and 2015–16).

Career
Barthe started his club career with Saint-Étienne, representing however only its B-team. In 2006, he joined Rodez AF and helped the team to gain promotion to Championnat National during a 2006–07 season.

Litex Lovech
On 11 July 2008, Barthe signed a four-year contract with Bulgarian side Litex Lovech after impressing during a short trial period. He made his debut in a 3–0 away win over Slavia Sofia on 9 August, playing full 90 minutes. During his three years at Lovech Stadium, he scored 5 goals in 72 matches in the league. Barthe collected a host of honours in his Litex career, as a two consecutive A Group titles, the Bulgarian Cup and the Bulgarian Supercup.

Ludogorets Razgrad
On 30 July 2011, Barthe joined Ludogorets Razgrad, signing a two-year contract. During the 2011–12 A PFG season, he formed a partnership with Ľubomír Guldan in the centre of defence and became an established first team player. In his first full season playing for Ludogorets, Barthe made 29 appearances in the A Group and ended the season winning his third consecutive league medal in Bulgaria and first with Ludogorets.l

On 13 January 2013, Barthe signed a two-year contract extension, keeping him at Ludogorets until 2015.

On 13 March 2014, Barthe suffered a severe injury in a game against Valencia of the Europa League. He was out for two months and made his return to the pitch in Ludogorets's away match at Levski Sofia on 11 May. At the end of the season, Barthe became the first foreign player to win five consecutive A PFG titles, as Ludogorets clinched their third championship in a row. He won a 6th title in succession in mid May 2015.

Grasshopper Club Zürich
On 12 June 2015, Barthe signed a three-year contract with the Swiss record champion Grasshopper Club Zürich.

CSKA Sofia
On 1 September 2017, Barthe signed with Bulgarian club CSKA Sofia.

On 8 September 2017, Barthe made his debut for CSKA Sofia in 3 – 0 home win against Vereya (Stara Zagora), making an appearance in the 85-th minute, replacing Nikolay Bodurov. He left the club at the end of the 2017–18 season.

Career statistics

Club

Honours

 Litex Lovech
 Bulgarian A Group. (2): 2009–10, 2010–11
 Bulgarian Cup. (1): 2008–09
 Bulgarian Supercup. (1): 2010
 Ludogorets Razgrad
 Bulgarian A Group. (4): 2011–12, 2012–13, 2013–14,  2014–15
 Bulgarian Cup. (2): 2011–12, 2013–14
 Bulgarian Supercup. (2): 2012, 2014

References

External links
 
 
 

1986 births
Living people
Sportspeople from Avignon
French footballers
Association football defenders
Rodez AF players
PFC Litex Lovech players
PFC Ludogorets Razgrad players
Grasshopper Club Zürich players
CS Universitatea Craiova players
PFC CSKA Sofia players
Championnat National players
First Professional Football League (Bulgaria) players
Swiss Super League players
Liga I players
French expatriate footballers
Expatriate footballers in Bulgaria
French expatriate sportspeople in Bulgaria
Expatriate footballers in Switzerland
French expatriate sportspeople in Switzerland
Expatriate footballers in Romania
French expatriate sportspeople in Romania
Footballers from Provence-Alpes-Côte d'Azur